Prometheus Bound is an Ancient Greek tragedy.

Prometheus Bound may also refer to:

 Prometheus Bound (Rubens), a c. 1611/12 painting by Peter Paul Rubens
 Prometheus Bound (Thomas Cole), an 1847 painting by Thomas Cole

See also
Prometheus Unbound (Shelley), an 1820 play by Percy Bysshe Shelley